Hyllestad is the administrative centre of Hyllestad Municipality in Vestland county, Norway.

The village of Hyllestad is the municipal centre and it is the site of the municipal government, local secondary school, bank, post office, and stores.

References

Villages in Vestland
Hyllestad